Ilova is a river in central Croatia, a left tributary of the Sava.

Ilova rises in the hilly areas of eastern Bilogora, south of Virovitica and Suhopolje, and flows towards the southwest, forming a series of lakes near Veliki Zdenci. It turns to the south near Garešnica, where there are another set of lakes at the confluence with the river Toplica that rises in Papuk. It then turns westward to pass near the eponymous village of Ilova south of Kutina, and then flows into the Sava in the eastern part of Lonjsko Polje nature park, about 3 km downstream from the mouth of the Lonja.

References

Rivers of Croatia
Landforms of Sisak-Moslavina County